Hitler Didi (English: literally Hitler Sister but figuratively Auntie Hitler) was a daily Indian soap opera that aired on Zee TV. It premiered on 7 November 2011. The story is located in the backdrop of Delhi. It has been replaced by Do Dil Bandhe Ek Dori Se in its timeslot. 

The title of the show has been called "disturbing" by the Anti-Defamation League. In North America and Europe, the show is known as General Didi.

Plot

Indira Sharma, who is the sole bread winner in her family, falls in love with Rishi Kumar. They both marry after facing so many obstacles. Indira got diagnosed with brain tumor has 28 days to survive. So she tried her best to make her family members settle without her less span of time. She also fulfilled her remaining wishes within those days. While letting Rishi marry Shweta, her tumor bursted. It was revealed she was pregnant and Shweta hid Indira's pregnancy from everyone under the scolding of Rishi's mother. To repent her mistake, Shweta becomes to surrogate mother of Indira's child. She gives birth to Indira and Rishi's daughter, Indu.

8 years later 

Indira is shown to have died. Rishi takes care of Indu as a single father, living in Indira's house. Indu is just like Indira. Zara Khan, Indira's look-alike police officer enters. Indira's family force Rishi to marry Zara. However, Indira is shown to be alive, having memory loss. Indu meets her and brings her back with Rishi's help. Zara kidnaps Indira. Rishi saves her and sends Zara to a mental asylum. After that a new character Kabir enters and it turns out he has a connection with Indira in some way. Indira constantly calls out to someone named Saheb it turns out Saheb is Kabir who has connection with Indira from Pakistan in the past . But After some twists, Indira regains her memory and reunites with Rishi, Indu and Her family. Zara returns and tries to create problems, but in vain. Finally, Indira gives birth to a son and Indu settles every Sharma men in their professions.

Cast

Main
 Rati Pandey as 
Indira Sharma Diwan Chandela – Inder and Kutumb's elder daughter; Munna, Vidhit and Mandira's sister; Rishi's wife; Indu and Chiku's mother
Zaara Khan – Indira's lookalike; Ex-police officer; Malik's ex-wife
 Sumit Vats as Rishikeshwar "Rishi" Diwan Chandela – Simi's younger son; Sameer's brother; Kulbhushan's cousin; Indira's husband; Indu and Chiku's father
 Shruti Bisht  as Indu Diwan Chandela – Indira and Rishi's daughter; Shweta's surrogate daughter; Chiku's sister; Ishaan and Seher's cousin
 Rituraj Singh as 
 Inder Sharma – Dulari's brother; Kutumb's husband; Jhumpa's ex-husband; Munna, Vidhit, Indira and Mandira's father; Ishaan, Seher, Indu and Chiku's grandfather
 Kala Diwan Chandela – Inder's lookalike; Jwaladevi's elder son; Kulbhushan's father

Recurring
 Sejal Shah as Kutumbh Sharma – Inder's wife; Munna, Vidhit, Indira and Mandira's mother; Ishaan, Seher, Indu and Chiku's grandmother
 Aakash Pandey as Radhe – Neighbour at Chandni Chowk; Estate agent
 Sandeep Baswana as Munna Sharma – Inder and Kutumb's elder son; Vidhit, Indira and Mandira's brother; Sunaina's husband; Savita's widower; Ishaan and Seher's father
 Smita Singh as Sunaina Sharma – Munna's wife; Ishaan and Seher's mother
 Gargi Sharma as Mandira Sharma Chaddha – Inder and Kutumb's younger daughter; Munna, Vidhit and Indira's sister; Pappu's wife
 Deepesh Bhan as Pappu Chaddha – Mandira's husband
 Kapil Soni as Vidhit Sharma – Inder and Kutumb's younger son; Munna, Indira and Mandira's brother
 Harsh Rajput as Ishaan Sharma – Munna and Sunaina's son; Seher's brother; Indu and Chiku's cousin
 Rahul Pendkalkar as Child Ishaan Sharma
 Divya Naaz as Seher Sharma – Munna and Sunaina's daughter; Ishaan's sister; Indu and Chiku's cousin
 Aasiya Kazi as Dr. Shweta Kapoor – Indu's surrogate mother
 Girish Jain as Dr. Jaswant Rai Singhania – Abha's husband; Sahil's father
 Silky Khanna as Abha Singhania – Jaswant's wife; Sahil's mother (Dead)
 Hardik Somnathwala as Sahil "Bheem" Singhania – Jaswant and Abha's son
 Rahil Azam as Malik Khan – A terrorist; Meher's brother; Zaara's ex-husband
 Preeya Subba as Meher Khan – Malik's sister; Inder's ex-lover
 Rohit Roy as Major Kabir Chaudhary / Saheb – Army officer; Noor's husband; Trisha's father
 Dolly Sohi as Noor Khan Chaudhary – Khan's daughter; Kabir's wife; Trisha's mother
 Unknown as Trisha "Babli" Chaudhary – Kabir and Noor's daughter
 Vikram Sahu as Major Khan – ISI Cheif; Noor's father
 Abhinav Shukla as Inspector Sumer Singh Chaudhary – Indira's helper
 Jasveer Kaur as Savita Sharma – Munna's second wife (Dead)
 Sheeba Chaddha as Dulari Sharma – Inder's sister
 Shabnam Sayed as Jhumpa Lahiri Sharma – Inder's ex-wife
 Navneet Nishan as Simi Diwan Chandela – Sameer and Rishi's mother; Indu and Chiku's grandmother
 Mrunal Jain as Sameer Diwan Chandela – Simi's elder son; Rishi's brother; Kulbhushan's cousin
 Jaanvi Sangwan as Jwaladevi Diwan Chandela – Kala's mother; Kulbhushan, Sameer and Rishi's grandmother; Indu and Chiku's great-grandmother
 Pankaj Vishnu as Kulbhushan Diwan Chandela – Kala's son; Sameer and Rishi's cousin; Nanda's husband
 Garima Bhardwaj as Nanda Diwan Chandela – Kulbhushan's wife
 Neha Talwar as Sajni – A bar dancer (Dead)
 Ravi Jhankal as RajRani – Owner of brothel
 Moorti Persaud as Jaya
Ashwini Kalsekar as Advocate Rani Bhatija
Vikas Anand as Judge during Mandira Sharma Rape case
 Sunita Rajwar as Jamuna Dhai
 Saurabh Yadav as Saurabh Sumer
 Nittin Sharma as Inspector Rudra "Vanraj" Pratap Singh 
Ranjeet as Ranjeet Kukreja, Owner Kukreja Properties as Special Appearance From  (Episodes 149 to 161)
Sonu Sood as Inspector Pratap Pandit as Special Appearance only in episode no 170
Asha Negi as Purvi Deshmukh Kirloskar

References

External links

 Hitler Didi. zeetv.com.

Indian television soap operas
Zee TV original programming
2011 Indian television series debuts
2013 Indian television series endings
Naming controversies
Television shows set in Delhi
Television controversies in India